is a Shinto shrine in Akasaka, Tokyo, Japan. In Tokyo, it is the best known of the 59 branch shrines of the Hikawa jinja, which was designated as the chief Shinto shrine (ichinomiya) for the former Musashi province.

History
The shrine structures were constructed in 1730 under the patronage of Tokugawa Yoshimune.  This became Yoshimune's personal shrine.

Notes

References
 Nussbaum, Louis-Frédéric and Käthe Roth. (2005).  Japan encyclopedia. Cambridge: Harvard University Press. ;  OCLC 58053128
 Rei Hino,s (Hino Rei),(Sailor Mars) Residence in Sailor Moon.

External links
 (In Japanese)

Shinto shrines in Tokyo